Izingolweni or Ezinqoleni is a town in Ugu District Municipality in the KwaZulu-Natal province of South Africa. It was founded in the 1870s as a police and administration post. The name comes from the Zulu language word for "place with very shallow holes." 
Izingolweni also consists of a school called Izingolweni Primary which is rumored that it was built by the community.
This very school is the center of excellence in the place.
It is very exceptional and produces very fine learners each year.

Administration
Ezinqoleni is administered by the Ray Nkonyeni Local Municipality which governs the Lower South Coast of KwaZulu-Natal. Ezinqoleni was previously administered by the Ezinqoleni Local Municipality but during the 2016 local elections the municipality amalgamated with the Hibiscus Coast Local Municipality to form the new Ray Nkonyeni Local Municipality.

Geography
Ezinqoleni is located on the KwaZulu-Natal South Coast on the far south of the province. It also lies on N2 national road about 40 km west of Port Shepstone and 107 km south-east of Kokstad.

Sources 
 Erasmus, B.P.J. (1995). Op Pad in Suid-Afrika. Jonathan Ball Uitgewers. .

References

Populated places in the Ray Nkonyeni Local Municipality
KwaZulu-Natal South Coast